The Móra Ferenc Museum (6720 Szeged, Roosevelt tér 1-3.) is a museum in Szeged, Hungary. The museum stands at the intersection of the bank of the river Tisza and the city's Downtown Bridge. In addition to its seasonal exhibitions, archaeological, ethnographic, historical, and scientific research is conducted at the museum. The museum was founded in 1883, and the neoclassical building was opened in 1896. The institute was renamed in the honor of its former Director, Móra Ferenc in 1950.

The work of renowned artists Victor Vasarely and Tivadar Csontváry Kosztka have been displayed in the Móra Ferenc Museum, and in 2012, an exhibition featuring the works of Mihály Munkácsy became the museum's then most successful seasonal exhibition. This record was exceeded in 2014 by an exhibition titled “Pharaohs’ Egypt” which attracted more than 114,000 visitors by year’s end.

Museum Collections 
The Móra Ferenc Memorial Room pay respects to the museum's former Director. Mora Ferenc is remembered as an outstanding figure in Hungarian national literature, and as an archaeologist and researcher. The exhibition room contains many of his personal items, including his furniture, and photo collection.

The museum's exhibition of natural sciences, titled “We Only Have One Earth,” presents us with Earth’s history from its formation, up to the modern era. Visitors can simulate travelling millions of years into the past with the help of installations, several millions of years old fossils, and a 3D animation of a cave bear.

The ethnographic exhibition is titled “The Famous Town of Szeged”. Its featured topics are Tisza-related activities, its best-known craft of making slippers and knives, bullrush weaving, the peculiarities of folk architecture. The folk life of the Szeged-area is illustrated using interactive, audiovisual equipment, in addition to the photo and audio material on various screens.

The Mora Ferenc museum's spectacle of gold collection is also open to the public and presents an approximately 10 kg of unique and highly valuable treasure. In the unconventionally lit room, visitors can view one of the biggest and more significant gold treasures of the Huns, the gold artifacts of Nagyszéksos, which were excavated by Ferenc Mora. The collection also features valuable red gold, memorial coins and particular household objects, such as the golden pen of Istvan Tomorkény (former director of the museum, writer, publicist) or a tie pin bearing Lajos Kossuth's engraved portrait.

Premises of Further Exhibitions

Fekete-ház (6720 Szeged, Somogyi u. 13.) 

The Fekete ház (meaning Black House) is situated at the heart of the city center and it is only a minute's walk away from the Dóm Square. The ground floor and first floor of the reputable building are places of valuable seasonal exhibitions. The upstairs rooms give home to a furniture collection replicating the interior of an upper class family’s home: visitors are provided with a glimpse into the civilian housing culture of Szeged.

The exhibition features two salons, a beautiful girl’s room and a tower room providing a view of Szeged the beauty of which is unmatched by any vantage point in the city. A permanent pharmacy history exhibition is also open to the public. Its main attraction is the equipment of the last remaining 19th century pharmacy in the Great Hungarian Plain.

Kass Gallery (6720 Szeged, Vár u. 7.) 

The gallery was dedicated to provide a glimpse into the various artistic phases of Kass János, who was one of Szeged’s most exceptional artists and a recipient of several prestigious state awards. In addition to the more outstanding works of János Kass, the gallery opened up to seasonal contemporary exhibitions and still is a supporting location of major temporary exhibitions.

Varga Mátyás Theatre History Collection and Exhibition Hall (6720 Szeged, Bécsi krt. 11/A) 

The three-story building and its nearly 300 m2 exhibition space puts the works (encompassing more than six decades) of Varga Mártyás on display, through which visitors are acquainted with a huge portion of Hungarian Theatre History. During the summer months the garden is a place of public talks and programs in connection with the local theatric scene and the Open-Air Festival of Szeged.

Castle and Stone Store (6720 Szeged, Stefánia sétány 15.) 

The Castle Museum is a place for organized events and seasonal exhibitions. The museum’s building is a remnant of the former castle of Szeged: it is an impressing architectural monument from the Baroque Period. The stone store is a collection of the most important architectural finds from the history of Szeged. Visitors of the stone store can acquaint themselves with architectural treasures from the Roman, Árpád, Medieval, Baroque and Renaissance Periods, thus roaming through two thousand years of architecture in one place.

References

External links 
 (en), (fr), (hu) 

Museums in Hungary
Szeged